Röthelstein is a former municipality in the district of Graz-Umgebung in the Austrian state of Styria. Since the 2015 Styria municipal structural reform, it is part of the municipality Frohnleiten.

Population

References

Graz Highlands
Cities and towns in Graz-Umgebung District